Simcenter STAR-CCM+ is a commercial Computational Fluid Dynamics (CFD) based simulation software developed by Siemens Digital Industries Software. Simcenter STAR-CCM+ allows the modeling and analysis of a range of engineering problems involving fluid flow, heat transfer, stress, particulate flow, electromagnetics and related phenomena.

Formerly known as STAR-CCM+, the software was first developed by CD-adapco and was acquired by Siemens Digital Industries Software as part of the purchase of CD-adapco in 2016. It is now a part of the Simcenter Portfolio of software tools.

History 
Development work on STAR-CCM+ was started after a decision was taken to design a new, integrated CFD tool to replace the existing product STAR-CD which had been developed during the 1980s and 1990s by Computational Dynamics Ltd, a spin-off company from an Imperial College London CFD research group. STAR-CD was widely used most notably in the automotive industry. STAR-CCM+ aimed to take advantage of more modern programming methods and to provide an expandable framework.

STAR-CCM+ was announced at the 2004 AIAA Aerospace Sciences Conference in Reno, Nevada. A unique feature was a generalized polyhedral cell formulation, allowing the solver to handle any mesh type imported. The first official release included the first commercially available polyhedral mesher, offering faster model convergence compared to an equivalent tetrahedral mesh.

Development 
Simcenter STAR-CCM+ is developed according to a continual improvement process, with a new version released every four months. The program uses a client-server architecture, implemented using object-oriented programming.

Capabilities 
Simcenter STAR-CCM+ is primarily Computational fluid dynamics software which uses the Finite element analysis or Finite volume method
to calculate the transport of physical quantities on a discretized mesh.
For fluid flow the Navier–Stokes equations are solved in each of the cells.
Simcenter STAR-CCM+ has multiphysics capabilities including:

 Fluid flow through porous media
 Multiphase flow
 Discrete element method
 Volume of fluid method
 Non-Newtonian fluid
 Rheology
 Turbulence
 Viscoelasticity

Release history

Usage 
Prior to CD-adapco's acquisition by Siemens, the customer base was approximately 3,200 accounts with 52% of licence sales attributed to the automotive industry.

See also 
 Computational fluid dynamics
 Computer simulation
 Computer-aided design
 Computer-aided engineering

References

External links 
 Simcenter STAR-CCM+ webpage
 Simcenter STAR-CCM+ on Simcenter Community
 Simcenter STAR-CCM+ Technical Forum

Simulation software
Numerical software
Computational fluid dynamics
Computer-aided engineering
Computer-aided engineering software
Finite element software